MTV Base is a 24-hour music channel from Paramount Networks EMEAA. There are three different feeds of MTV Base Africa; for South Africa, West Africa and East Africa respectively.

History 

The channel was launched in February 2005 with a live music special with live performances from local African and international artists, along with some music video and reality programming from MTV Europe. The network also carries the American and European awards ceremonies of MTV and BET.

On 3 July 2013, Viacom International Media Networks Africa launched an localised feed of MTV Base exclusively for South Africa, with local programming, advertising and VJs. It launched on DStv on 5 March 2019.

See also
MTV Africa
Viacom International Media Networks Africa

References

External links 
MTV Base (Pan-Africa)
MTV South Africa

MTV channels
Television channels and stations established in 2005
Music organizations based in Nigeria
Television channel articles with incorrect naming style
Television stations in South Africa